Vento may refer to:

 Vento (surname), a Finnish and Italian surname
 Vento (motorcycle manufacturer), an Italian motorcycle manufacturer
 Volkswagen Vento (A3), a German compact sedan
 Volkswagen Vento (A05), a German subcompact sedan
 VinFast Vento, an electric scooter by VinFast from Vingroup